Musa Haji Ismail Galal (1917–1980) was a Somali writer, scholar, linguist, historian and polymath. He is notable for the creation of the Somali Arabic script.

Biography
Galal was born in 1917 in Burao. He hails from the Habar Jeclo clan of the Isaaq. He is noted for having contributed to the development of Wadaad script. In the 1950s, Galal introduced a more radical alteration of the Arabic script to represent the Afro-Asiatic Somali language. He came up with an entirely new set of symbols for the Somali vowels. I.M. Lewis (1958) considers this to be the most accurate Arabic script to have been devised for the Somali language. 
A prolific writer, Galal was also among the foremost authorities on the Somali astrological, meteorological and calendrical systems. He devoted two major works to traditional Somali science, both of which are regarded as classics in Somali Studies. He was prolific in recording and writing about Somali poetry and his recordings include the work of Salaan Carrabey.

After a long scholarly career, Galal died in 1980.

In his honour, the Somali Studies Association periodically presents the Musa Galaal Award to Somalists whose work on Somali history and culture has earned distinction.

Bibliography
The terminology and practice of Somali weather lore, astronomy, and astrology (1968)
Stars, seasons and weather in Somali pastoral traditions (1970)

See also
Osman Yusuf Kenadid
Shire Jama Ahmed
Salaan Carrabey

Notes

References

External links
Stars, Seasons and Weather in Somali Pastoral Traditions (Pre-publication excerpts)
The Terminology and Practice of Somali Weather Lore, Astronomy, and Astrology (Book review)

1917 births
1980 deaths
Ethnic Somali people
Linguists from Somalia
Somalian historians
Somalian writers
Somalian non-fiction writers
Somalian scholars
Somalists
20th-century historians
Somali-language writers
20th-century linguists
20th-century non-fiction writers